is a Nissan Motorsports & Customizing division focused on tuning and converting Nissan cars. Autech was a subsidiary company of Nissan from its establishment in 1986 to 2022, when it was merged with Nismo.

History
Autech was founded in 1986 as a subsidiary of Nissan. Nissan named Shinichiro Sakurai, the former general manager of the company's Advanced Vehicle Design Department, as the first president of the new company.

Partnership with Zagato
On 27 May 1987 Autech and the Italian company Zagato signed an agreement to jointly produce a luxury sports car aimed mainly at the Japanese market. Autech was responsible for the engine and chassis, and Zagato of the interior and exterior design. The new car used the platform of the Nissan Leopard and was called Autech Zagato Stelvio AZ1. It was unveiled in 1989, with 203 cars planned to be made (three of which were prototypes). Costs kept increasing during development and in the end 104 units were produced.

Merging with Nismo
In December 2021, Nissan said it would merge Autech and sister company Nismo (a motorsport operation) into a new company called Nissan Motorsports & Customizing Co., Ltd.. The merge was completed on 1 April 2022.

Facilities
The head offices and factory are located in Chigasaki-shi, Kanagawa Prefecture. There are additional offices in Nagoya and Fukuoka and an ASEAN office in Bangkok, Thailand.

Activities

Autech modifies various vehicles to adapt them for use by disabled people and to meet the needs of different work areas. It also has tuned Nissan cars.

Tuned vehicles

Some cars produced by Autech ("Autech Version") include the following:
 Cedric Y31 Autech Version long wheelbase
 Skyline Autech Version (HR31 coupe) made in 1988
 Skyline Autech Version (BNR32 four-door)
 Skyline GT-R Autech Version 40th Anniversary (BCNR33 four-door) made in 1998
 Silvia Autech Version K's MF-T (S14)
 Nissan Datsun Truck (D21) WILD ADDAX Autech Version (JDM) 1993-1996
 Nissan Datsun Truck (D22) SKYSTAR Autech Version (JDM) 1997-2000
 Pulsar GTi-R (N14), 31 units to date have been recorded
 Pulsar Serie Autech (HN15), made in 1996
 Pulsar Serie 3DOOR Hatchback VZ-R N1 version II (JN15)
 Stagea Autech Version 260RS (WC34) made in 1996-2001
 Stagea Autech AXIS 350S (HM35) made in 2003-04
 Silvia S15 N/A Autech Version
 Silvia Varietta - S15 N/A convertible hard-top Autech Version
 Fairlady Z (Z33) Nismo 380RS (JDM)
 X-Trail Axis - (JDM) 
 Dualis - (JDM)
 Bluebird Sylphy - (JDM)
 Teana - (JDM)
 Serena (C26) - (JDM)
 Serena (C27) - (JDM)
 Wingroad - (JDM)
 Tiida - (JDM)
 Cube Rider (Z10) - (JDM)
 Primera (P10) - (JDM)
 Primera (P11) - (JDM) 
 Regulus 'Star Fire' - (R50) - (JDM) 
 Lucino (B14) - (JDM) 
 Elgrand Rider (E50 and E51 Models) - (JDM)
 Elgrand VIP (E52)
 Grand Livina Highway Star Autech - L10 (2011) and L11 (2014)
 Note Rider/Axis (E11/E12) - (JDM)

References

External links
Autech Japan (English)

Nissan
Auto parts suppliers of Japan
Companies based in Kanagawa Prefecture
Automotive companies established in 1986
Automotive motorsports and performance companies
Japanese companies established in 1986
Japanese brands